Mariolino Barberis (born Mario Barberis, Turin, 14 August 1949) is an Italian singer.

Biography
At the age of twelve, Barberis started performing in competitions and events in Piedmont. Later, he released some tracks for the ECO casa musicale of Milan (Monza). In 1964 he participated in the Castrocaro Festival, a famous contest for new voices, where he was noticed by Teddy Reno, who offered him a recording contract with ARC. In the following year he participated in the Cantagiro for Young Newcomers, winning first place with the songIl duca della luna (text by Giancarlo Guardabassi, music Caligiana, arrangement of Ennio Morricone, on backing vocals with the "Cantori Moderni" by Alessandroni).

Because of his extensive and melodic voice and polio affecting his legs since childhood (which forces him to walk with a cane), he is nicknamed the "Tajoli the sixties by the press.

Barberis started to make live performances accompanied by Flash, a group of three boys from Turin consisting of Marcello Capra on guitars, Angelo Girardi on bass and Mark Astarita on drums that in the next decade will play in Turin with known progressive groups, like the Procession and Venegoni & Co.

In the following year, 1966, he once again won first place at Cantagiro with Spiaggia d'argento and performed in many television shows, including "Settevoci", led by Pippo Baudo. He later changed his label, moving to DKF Folklore, a label tied to the Turin studio Format of Happy Ruggiero, which created, among others, a review of "My Place" presented in full by Tony Renis at the Sanremo Festival of 1968 and "This is the city", which Barberis authored with Roger.

Discography
 1961 – Scende la sera ( Collana Canti Ricreativi, Canti Scout volume 1 – direttore del coro: Dusan S.) ( ECO casa musicale, ECO 1031 ).
 1961 – Canto del lupetto ( Collana Canti Ricreativi, Canti Scout volume 2 – direttore del coro: Dusan S.) ( ECO casa musicale, ECO 1032 ).
 1961 – L'ali d'oro ( Consonni E. – Nason L.) / Un amico ( Drake E. – Giudici L.) ECO casa musicale, ECO 1056S ).
 1965 – Il duca della luna – (Guardabassi-Caligiani) – 2:35 (ARC, AN 4056) – arranged and Conducted by Ennio Morricone – chorus (I Cantori Moderni di Alessandroni)
 1965 – Quando a settembre – (Rossi-Romitelli) – 2:11 (ARC, AN 4056) – arranged and Conducted by Ennio Morricone – chorus (I Cantori Moderni di Alessandroni)
 1966 – Spiaggia d'argento ( Giancarlo Guardabassi – Mantovani G. – Caligiani G.) / Eppure ti amo ( Bacchetti M. – Latessa ) ( ARC, AN 4087 )
 1967 – Questa è la città ( Barberis M.- Scala R.) / Tu lo vedrai ( Cameron – Franchi ) ( DKF Folklore, KF 30042 )
 1967 – Salvé venesia ( Sciorilli E. – Ruggiero F. and his orchestra (arranged) – Tombolato P.) ( DKF Folklore, KF 11037 )
 1968 – Il posto mio ( Renis T. – Ruggiero F. (arrangiamento) – Testa A. ) / Agnese ( Barberis M. – Ferracioli L. – Giorgini B. in Dunn ) ( DKF Folklore, KF 30050 )
 1970 – Un pianoforte nella sera ( Borghi D. – Panzuti D. ) / Rosso il tramonto ( Barberis M. – Venturia – Testa A. – Langella F. ) ( DKF Folklore, KF 30076 )
 1985 – Occhi di bimba ( Barberis M. – Russo A. – Iozzo J. ) / Nell'oscurità ( Barberis M.- Russo A. – Iozzo J. ) ( Drums, EDN 2215 )

Bibliography
 Various Authors (edited by Gino Castaldo), Il dizionario della canzone italiana, publisher Armando Curcio (1990); heading Barberis, Mariolino'', of Enzo Giannelli, pag. 107

References

External links
 Mariolino Barberis official channel on Youtube

Italian male singers
Living people
1949 births